

Mission and History  
The Southeastern Universities Research Association (SURA) was established in 1980 as a 501(c)(3).  SURA's mission is to advance collaborative research and education and to strengthen the scientific capabilities of its members and our nation.

Organization 
SURA is a consortium of 54 universities in the United States and 1 in Canada.

SURA is the sole member of Jefferson Science Associates, LLC (JSA), which holds the Management and Operations (M&O) contract for Thomas Jefferson National Accelerator Facility in Newport News, Virginia.  In addition to Jefferson Lab, SURA supports space and science technology, information technology and coastal and environmental research initiatives.

SURAnet 

The chief goal of SURA was the development of a particle accelerator for research in nuclear physics; this facility is now known as the Thomas Jefferson National Accelerator Facility. By the mid-1980s it was clear that access to high-capacity computer resources would be needed to facilitate collaboration among the SURA member institutions. A high-performance network to provide this access was essential, but no single institution could afford to develop such a system. SURA itself stepped up to the challenge and, with support from the U.S. National Science Foundation (NSF) and SURA universities, SURAnet was up and running in 1987, and was part of the first phase of National Science Foundation Network (NSFNET) funding as the agency built a network to facilitate scientific collaboration.

Current 
Today, SURA consists of over 54 member universities and CEBAF is now known as the Thomas Jefferson National Accelerator Facility (Jefferson Lab). SURA continues to operate the Jefferson Lab for the U.S. Department of Energy through Jefferson Science Associates, LLC. SURA also operates the SURA Residence Facility, guest house to accommodate national and international researchers who come to use Jefferson Lab's unique facilities. SURA's intramural research activities are collaborations with its member institutions, government agencies, and other researchers working to advance and exploit the transformative nature of information technology on the regional, national, and international fronts, and facilitating a better understanding of coastal, ocean and environmental phenomena that plays a prominent role in our lives.

Member institutions 
Member Institutions:

References

External links

College and university associations and consortia in the United States
College and university associations and consortia in North America
International college and university associations and consortia